Archeological Site No. 143-12 is a historic camp site in Ripogenus, Maine. The site is part of the Penobscot Headwater Lakes Prehistoric Sites and was added to the National Register of Historic Places on October 31, 1995.

References

		
National Register of Historic Places in Piscataquis County, Maine